There are at least 290 named mountain passes in Montana.
 Ahern Pass, Glacier County, Montana, el. 
 Alder Pass, Beaverhead County, Montana, el. 
 Ambrose Saddle, Ravalli County, Montana, el. 
 Antelope Pass, Valley County, Montana, el. 
 Antone Pass, Beaverhead County, Montana, el. 
 Badger Pass, Beaverhead County, Montana, el. 
 Badger Pass, Flathead County, Montana, el. 
 Bannack Pass, Beaverhead County, Montana, el. 
 Bannock Pass, Beaverhead County, Montana, el. 
 Battle Ridge Pass, Gallatin County, Montana, el. 
 Bear Creek Pass, Ravalli County, Montana, el. 
 Bear Creek Pass, Ravalli County, Montana, el. 
 Bear Creek Saddle, Ravalli County, Montana, el. 
 Beaverhead Canyon Gateway, Beaverhead County, Montana, el. 
 Big Hole Pass, Beaverhead County, Montana, el. 
 Big Hole Pass, Beaverhead County, Montana, el. 
 Bitterroot Pass, Granite County, Montana, el. 
 Blacktail Pass, Gallatin County, Montana, location unknown, el. 
 Blodgett Pass, Ravalli County, Montana, el. 
 Bobcat Pass, Carbon County, Montana, el. 
 Bobcat Saddle, Ravalli County, Montana, el. 
 Boulder Pass, Flathead County, Montana, el. 
 Boulder Pass, Park County, Montana, el. 
 Bozeman Pass, Gallatin County, Montana, el. 
 Brewster Tyler Saddle, Granite County, Montana, el. 
 Brown Pass, Valley County, Montana, el. 
 Brown Pass, Glacier County, Montana, el. 
 Browns Meadow Pass, Flathead County, Montana, el. 
 Buck Creek Saddle, Ravalli County, Montana, el. 
 Buck Horn Saddle, Ravalli County, Montana, el. 
 Buffalo Horn Pass, Gallatin County, Montana, el. 
 Bull of the Woods Pass, Park County, Montana, el. 
 Bullion Pass, Mineral County, Montana, el. 
 Burr Saddle, Sanders County, Montana, el. 
 Burr Saddle, Mineral County, Montana, el. 
 Cache Saddle, Mineral County, Montana, el. 
 Cadotte Pass, Lewis and Clark County, Montana, el. 
 Camp Creek Pass, Powell County, Montana, el. 
 Camp Pass, Lewis and Clark County, Montana, el. 
 Camps Pass, Powder River County, Montana, el. 
 Carney Pass, Lincoln County, Montana, el. 
 Cayuse Saddle, Mineral County, Montana, el. 
 Champion Pass, Jefferson County, Montana, el. 
 Chief Joseph Pass, Beaverhead County, Montana, el. 
 Chilcoot Pass, Mineral County, Montana, el. 
 Chilkoot Pass, Garfield County, Montana, el. 
 Cinnabar Saddle, Ravalli County, Montana, el. 
 Cinnamon Bear Saddle, Granite County, Montana, el. 
 Colter Pass, Park County, Montana, el. 
 Columbine Pass, Sweet Grass County, Montana, el. 
 Comeau Pass, Flathead County, Montana, el. 
 Cooper Pass, Sanders County, Montana, el. 
 Coriacan Defile, Missoula County, Montana, el. 
 Crazy Horse Gap, Sheridan County, Montana, el. 
 Cube Iron Pass, Sanders County, Montana, el. 
 Cut Bank Pass, Glacier County, Montana, el. 
 Cutaway Pass, Deer Lodge County, Montana, el. 
 Daisy Creek Pass, Sanders County, Montana, el. 
 Daisy Narrows, Meagher County, Montana, el. 
 Daisy Notch, Meagher County, Montana, el. 
 Daisy Pass, Park County, Montana, el. 
 Daley Gap, Fergus County, Montana, el. 
 Daly Pass, Gallatin County, Montana, el. 
 Dawson Pass, Glacier County, Montana, el. 
 Deadman Pass, Beaverhead County, Montana, el. 
 Deer Lodge Pass, Silver Bow County, Montana, el. 
 Deer Pass, McCone County, Montana, el. 
 Duck Creek Pass, Broadwater County, Montana, el. 
 Durfee Gap, Fergus County, Montana, el. 
 Eagle Pass, Lake County, Montana, (Salish: nšt̓ew̓s sx̣ʷcusi ), el. 
 Eagle Rock Saddle, Mineral County, Montana, el. 
 East Fork Pass, Sanders County, Montana, el. 
 East Fork Pass, Mineral County, Montana, el. 
 Echo Pass, Powell County, Montana, el. 
 Elbow Gorge, Teton County, Montana, el. 
 Elbow Pass, Lewis and Clark County, Montana, el. 
 Elk Horn Pass, Meagher County, Montana, el. 
 Elk Park Pass, Silver Bow County, Montana, el. 
 Elk Pass, Sanders County, Montana, el. 
 Elk Pass, Lake County, Montana, el. 
 Elk Pass, Lewis and Clark County, Montana, el. 
 Elk Saddle, Judith Basin County, Montana, el. 
 Emigrant Gap, Glacier County, Montana, el. 
 Expedition Pass, Madison County, Montana, el. 
 Firebrand Pass, Flathead County, Montana, el. 
 Flat Creek Pass, Chouteau County, Montana, el. 
 Flathead Pass, Gallatin County, Montana, el. 
 Flesher Pass, Lewis and Clark County, Montana, el. 
 Fred Burr Pass, Granite County, Montana, el. 
 Freeman Pass, Lake County, Montana, el. 
 Freezeout Pass, Mineral County, Montana, el. 
 Gable Pass, Glacier County, Montana, el. 
 Gaffeney Pass, Sheridan County, Montana, el. 
 Game Pass, Granite County, Montana, el. 
 Gates of the Rocky Mountains, Lewis and Clark County, Montana, el. 
 Gateway Gorge, Flathead County, Montana, el. 
 Gateway Pass, Flathead County, Montana, el. 
 Getaway Pass, Lake County, Montana, el. 
 Gibbons Pass, Beaverhead County, Montana, el. 
 Glidden Pass, Sanders County, Montana, el. 
 Goat Pass, Missoula County, Montana, el. 
 Goldstone Pass, Beaverhead County, Montana, el. 
 Gordon Pass, Missoula County, Montana, el. 
 Granite Pass, Missoula County, Montana, el. 
 Granulated Pass, Silver Bow County, Montana, el. 
 Griffin Pass, Powder River County, Montana, el. 
 Guide Saddle, Ravalli County, Montana, el. 
 Gunsight Pass, Glacier County, Montana, el. 
 Hagen Gap, Garfield County, Montana, el. 
 Hahn Creek Pass, Powell County, Montana, el. 
 Haines Pass, Flathead County, Montana, el. 
 Half Moon Pass, Fergus County, Montana, el. 
 Hardrobe Water Gap, Big Horn County, Montana, el. 
 Haskell Pass, Flathead County, Montana, el. 
 Hatcher Pass, Carbon County, Montana, el. 
 Haymaker Narrows, Wheatland County, Montana, el. 
 Headquarters Creek Pass, Teton County, Montana, el. 
 Hell Gate, McCone County, Montana, el. 
 Hellroaring Pass, Lake County, Montana, el. 
 Hidden Lake Pass, Glacier County, Montana, el. 
 Himes Pass, Sanders County, Montana, el. 
 Holloman Saddle, Missoula County, Montana, el. 
 Homestake Pass, Jefferson County, Montana, el. 
 Hoodoo Pass, Mineral County, Montana, el. 
 Hoodoo Pass, Madison County, Montana, el. 
 Horse Creek Pass, Ravalli County, Montana, el. 
 Hungry Creek Pass, McCone County, Montana, el. 
 Iceberg Notch, Glacier County, Montana, el. 
 Inspiration Pass, Flathead County, Montana, el. 
 Inuya Pass, Flathead County, Montana, el. 
 Jefferson Pass, Glacier County, Montana, el. 
 Joan Creek Pass, Sanders County, Montana, el. 
 Jordan Pass, Sweet Grass County, Montana, el. 
 Kings Hill Pass, Meagher County, Montana, el. 
 Klondike Pass, Meagher County, Montana, el. 
 Knox Pass, Mineral County, Montana, el. 
 Kootenai Narrows, Lincoln County, Montana, el. 
 Kootenai Pass, Flathead County, Montana, el. 
 Larch Hill Pass, Flathead County, Montana, el. 
 Ledoford Pass, Madison County, Montana, el. 
 Lemhi Pass, Beaverhead County, Montana, el. 
 Lewis and Clark Pass, Lewis and Clark County, Montana, el. 
 Lick Creek Saddle, Ravalli County, Montana, el. 
 Limestone Pass, Powell County, Montana, el. 
 Lincoln Pass, Flathead County, Montana, el. 
 Lion Creek Pass, Flathead County, Montana, el. 
 Lions Pass, McCone County, Montana, el. 
 Lodgepole Saddle, Granite County, Montana, el. 
 Logan Pass, Glacier County, Montana, el. 
 Lolo Pass, Missoula County, Montana, el. 
 Lone Tree Pass, Beaverhead County, Montana, el. 
 Lone Tree Pass, Lake County, Montana, el. 
 Lookout Pass, Mineral County, Montana, el. 
 Lost Buck Pass, Lincoln County, Montana, el. 
 Lost Horse Pass, Ravalli County, Montana, el. 
 Low Pass, Deer Lodge County, Montana, el. 
 Low Pass, Madison County, Montana, el. 
 Lulu Pass, Park County, Montana, el.

See also
 List of mountains in Montana
 List of mountain ranges in Montana

Notes

 
Mountain passes
Montana